Guy Anthony Grundy (born 9 July 1970) is an Australian bodybuilder and actor.

Born in Penrith, New South Wales, Grundy has placed first in the Mr. Australia championships twice and placed 2nd in the Mr. World competition twice (in 1999 and 2001). As a professional bodybuilder, he was photographed regularly for major muscle and fitness magazines. He has also written articles for magazines such as MuscleMag. Since retiring from professional bodybuilding, Grundy has appeared as an actor in films, advertisements, and television shows. He was featured in a documentary on bodybuilding by British documentary maker Louis Theroux.

Bodybuilding statistics
 Height: 
 Weight (contest):

Contest history
1991 South Coast
Division – Junior
Place – 2nd

1992 NSW Championships
Division – Light heavy weights
Place – 1st

1992 South Pacific Titles
Division – Light heavy weights
Place – 2nd

1993 Australasian Championships
1st National show
Division – Light heavy weights
Place – 2nd

1994 Australasian Championships
Division – Heavy weights
Place – 2nd

1995 Australasian Championships
Division – Heavy weights
Place- Champion

1996 IFBB pro Qualifier
Division – Open to all national champions
Place – 2nd

1997 IFBB pro Qualifier
Division – Open to all national champions
Place – 2nd

1999 National Championships
Place – Champion

1999 World Championships
Place – 2nd

2000 World Championships
Place – 2nd

2002 World Championships
Place – 2nd

References

External links
 Interview with Grundy
 Profile of Grundy
 Another Grundy interview
 Bodybuilding.com Interview 1
 Bodybuilding.com Interview 2
 Interview 3
 Interview with Guy Grundy

Australian bodybuilders
Professional bodybuilders
Living people
1970 births
People from New South Wales